Mango is a city and a neighborhood of Jamshedpur city. It is situated across the Subarnarekha River and is connected to Jamshedpur via three bridges laid side by side. It is a huge and growing residential area. Once a less populated little town in the Dhalbhum subdivision of the East Singhbhum district , it is now a booming neighborhood and real estate hotbed.

Mango has the status of a 'city' according to the government through being part of the main city Jamshedpur. It is a notified area and is run by its own notified area committee, namely, Mango Notified Area Committee (MNAC). The electricity services are provided by the state-run electricity board, JBVNL(Jharkhand Bijli Vitran Nigam Limited).

Despite being a booming neighborhood and seeing a drastic increase in real estate businesses, this area has been plagued with one of the highest crime rates in the city of Jamshedpur. Named "the crime hub of Jamshedpur" by local news websites and journalists, this area has witnessed a significant rise in crime rates over the past decade, Blocks like Ulidih, Azadnagar and Shankusai (Sankosai) being the centres of violent crimes including thefts and shootings.

Geography

Location

Jamshedpur Urban Agglomeration 
With its recognition as an industrial town as early as the 1911 census, Jamshedpur was set on the road of steady population growth, as large number of emigrants flocked in for work opportunities. While in the earlier decades the central nucleus grew, in the later decades towns around Jamshedpur grew rapidly. In 2011, Jamshedpur Urban Agglomeration included 13 urban centres, with a total population of 1.3 million people. However, in more recent years, Jamshedpur UA “has lacked the growth and development observed around other similar industrial towns in western and southern India.”

Note: The map alongside presents the Jamshedpur Urban Agglomeration. All places marked in the map are linked in the larger full screen map.

Civic administration
There is a police station at Mango.

Demographics
According to the 2011 Census of India, Mango had a total population of 223,805, of which 115,970 (52%) were males and 107,835 (48%) were females. Population in the age range 0–6 years was 29,338. The total number of literate persons in Mango was 166,870 (85.81% of the population over 6 years).

(*For language details see Golmuri-cum-Jugsalai block#Language and religion)

Jamshedpur Urban Agglomeration includes: Jamshedpur (Industrial Town), Jamshedpur (NAC), Tata Nagar Railway Colony (OG), Mango (NAC),  Jugsalai (M), Bagbera (CT), Chhota Gobindpur (CT), Haludbani (CT), Sarjamda (CT), Gadhra (CT), Ghorabandha (CT), Purihasa (CT), Adityapur (M Corp.), Chota Gamahria (CT) and Kapali (CT).

 India census, Mango had a population of 166,091. Males constitute 53% of the population and females 47%. Mango has an average literacy rate of 70%, higher than the national average of 59.5%: male literacy is 76%, and female literacy is 63%. In Mango, 14% of the population is under 6 years of age.

Economy
Mango's economy is mostly based on real estate and it is the largest hotspot for this sector. Apart from that Mango's economy is mostly based on motor parts manufacturing, selling & repairs and transportation. However, in recent years the area has also became a destination of information technology (IT) and business processing outsource (BPO). Aegis have a campus in Maango which employees around 2000 peoples.

Mango also have industries like Jharkhand State Beverages Corp., Triveni Earthmovers etc.

Education
Al Kabir Polytechnic
Netaji Subhas University 
Awadh Dental College & Hospital
Mahatma Gandhi Memorial Medical College & Hospital
Karim City College (Mango Campus)
Jamshedpur Worker's College
J.K.S College
Maryland Institute Of Technology & Management
RVS College of Engineering & Technology
Grace Bible College
Kabir Memorial Urdu high school

Transport
Many buses and auto-rickshaws operate from Sakchi, Jamshedpur to Mango on a regular basis. Tatanagar Junction railway station is the nearest railway station at a distance of 12 km.

See also
 List of neighbourhoods of Jamshedpur

References

Cities and towns in East Singhbhum district
Jamshedpur
Neighbourhoods in Jamshedpur